Damian Patrick Martin (born 5 September 1984) is an Australian former professional basketball player, best known for his 11 seasons with the Perth Wildcats of the National Basketball League (NBL). After four years of college basketball for Loyola Marymount, Martin began his NBL career in 2007 with the West Sydney Razorbacks. In 2009, he made the move to Perth to join the Wildcats, where he went on to become a six-time NBL champion and six-time NBL Best Defensive Player. He is considered one of the NBL's all-time best defenders.

Early life and career
As a 15-year-old at the NSW Institute of Sport, Martin was influenced by future and long-time mentor Rob Beveridge to concentrate on basketball rather than rugby league, a move that set Martin on the path to his greatest personal achievement – winning a gold medal with the Australian national junior team under Beveridge and alongside the likes of Andrew Bogut at the 2003 FIBA Under-19 World Championship. In 2002 and 2003, Martin attended the Australian Institute of Sport and played for the program's SEABL team.

Between 2003 and 2007, Martin played three seasons of NCAA Division I college basketball for Loyola Marymount University. After a successful freshman and sophomore seasons, he was forced to redshirt the 2005–06 season due to a ruptured Achilles tendon he suffered while playing with the national team. He returned to the Lions in 2006–07. In his three seasons for LMU, he played 88 games (69 starts) and averaged 4.6 points, 3.9 rebounds, 3.2 assists and 1.8 steals per game, and was a West Coast Conference All-Freshmen team honouree in 2003–04.

Professional career

West Sydney Razorbacks / Sydney Spirit
In 2007, Martin returned to his home state and signed with the West Sydney Razorbacks of the National Basketball League. Ten games into the 2007–08 season, Martin suffered a season-ending knee injury. He continued on with the club for the 2008–09 season, with their new name being the Sydney Spirit. The Spirit were in dire financial straits during the 2008–09 season, with the 10 contracted players and three coaches, including head coach Rob Beveridge, all agreeing to live off just $150,000 between them to keep the franchise going—roughly $700 per week for Martin. Furthermore, Martin played much of the season with a broken wrist, an injury that occurred during the pre-season tournament. The injury should have sidelined him immediately, but in December 2008, it was noted that Martin didn't want to make a fuss because he put the team first and himself second.

Perth Wildcats

Following the demise of the Sydney Spirit, Martin followed Beveridge west, where the pair joined the Perth Wildcats for the 2009–10 NBL season. Martin saw immediate success, helping the Wildcats win the championship in his first season. He subsequently earned an Australian Boomers call-up. In 2011, he won the NBL Best Defensive Player Award for the first time and was named to the All-NBL First Team. Over the ensuing three seasons, he won three more Best Defensive Player awards, was named to the All-NBL Team every year, and helped the Wildcats reach three straight grand finals, winning his second championship in 2014. He missed the 2013 grand final series with a partial tear of his Achilles tendon, an injury that he suffered during the semi-final series. In January 2013, Martin was named co-captain of the Wildcats alongside Shawn Redhage. In October 2013, he was named the sole captain of the Wildcats.

2014–15 season
On 14 May 2014, Martin re-signed with the Wildcats on a two-year deal (with the option of a third). On 24 October 2014, he recorded nine rebounds, nine steals and eight assists in an 84–63 win over the Sydney Kings. Nine steals is the second most by a Perth Wildcat in the club's history, behind only Ricky Grace's 10 in 1990. He was subsequently named Player of the Week for round three. On 31 December 2014, in an 86–77 win over the Wollongong Hawks, Martin played his 200th NBL game. In March 2015, Martin was named the NBL's Best Defensive Player for the fifth consecutive year.

2015–16 season
On 4 November 2015, Martin suffered a broken jaw and missing teeth following an errant elbow from Townsville Crocodiles forward Brian Conklin. He returned to action by the end of the month, despite originally being ruled out for three weeks. In February, he played his 200th game for the Wildcats, and in March, he won his third NBL championship and was named Grand Final MVP.

2016–17 season

On 2 June 2016, Martin signed a new three-year deal with the Wildcats. Two months later, Martin made his Olympic debut for the Australian Boomers at the 2016 Rio Olympics.

On 23 October 2016, Martin recorded a career-high 13 rebounds in a 72–69 win over Melbourne United. During the game, he received a heavy knock to the head, with x-rays revealing a fracture to the left side of his jaw. Consequently, he was ruled out for two weeks of action. He returned after missing just one game, but sustained another injury, this time a grade three MCL tear in his left knee against the Adelaide 36ers on 5 November. He was subsequently ruled out for 10 to 12 weeks. Much like in 2015–16, Martin managed to return from injury earlier than expected, as he joined the playing group for their first game of 2017 on 7 January in Sydney against the Kings. He helped the Wildcats win back-to-back road games for the first time in more than one year, as he picked up a team-high two steals in an 80–74 victory. On 28 January, in his 250th NBL game, Martin scored a season-high 11 points to go with six rebounds and four assists in a 73–71 win over Melbourne. The Wildcats finished the regular season in third place with a 15–13 record, and played the second-seeded Cairns Taipans in the semi-finals, a series the Wildcats swept 2–0. The series sweep advanced the Wildcats into the NBL Grand Final for the sixth time in eight years. In the best-of-five grand final series against the Illawarra Hawks, Martin was superb on defence in Game 1 (limiting the dynamic Rotnei Clarke to just eight shots), hit the scoreboard in Game 2 (scoring 12 points on four three-pointers), and did a bit of everything in Game 3 (three points, five rebounds, three assists, two steals) to lead the Wildcats to a 3–0 series sweep and an eighth NBL championship. Martin collected his fourth championship, as the Wildcats defended their title for the first time since 1990/1991. It was a special championship win according to Martin, due to the team's adversity in 2016–17. The Wildcats slumped to last spot in December (7–9 record) as the team's injury toll started to have a significant impact. Long-term injuries to Martin, Jarrod Kenny and Matt Knight hurt the Wildcats, while early-season import shuffles disrupted the team's cohesiveness. The Wildcats only just scraped through to the finals after beating Melbourne United away in the final round. The victory extended Perth's playoff streak into a record 31st straight season. Martin said in February, "I've been fortunate to be a part of three Championships. If we win it this season, it would mean more to me than any of the other three because of all the adversity we've gone through. It's been such a special season."

2017–18 season
The Wildcats started the season 10–3, as they sat atop the ladder following Round 9. On 14 December 2017, Martin was ruled out for a number of games with an ankle injury. In the two games he missed, the Wildcats dropped to 10–5; he made his return for the Wildcats' New Year's Eve game against the Cairns Taipans in Cairns. On 4 February 2018, in a loss to the Adelaide 36ers in Adelaide, Martin played his 250th game for the Wildcats. The Wildcats finished the regular season in third place with a 16–12 record. On the eve of the Wildcats' finals campaign, Martin was named the NBL's Best Defensive Player for the 2017–18 season, earning the honour for a record-breaking sixth time. The Wildcats went on to lose in straight sets to the 36ers in the semi-finals.

2018–19 season

A left leg injury kept Martin out of pre-season games in September 2018. After helping the Wildcats start the season with a 4–1 record, he was ruled out of the Wildcats' match on 3 November against the Breakers with a low grade tear to his right calf muscle. He subsequently missed six games. The Wildcats reached a 10–1 record before dropping to 12–9 in early January. On 25 January, he recorded 15 points, six rebounds, five assists and three steals in a 100–81 win over the Adelaide 36ers. On 10 February, he recorded 15 points, seven rebounds, four assists and three steals in a 95–86 overtime win over the Sydney Kings. He hit a 3-pointer late in the fourth quarter to send the game into overtime. The win saw the Wildcats move to a 17–9 record, with coach Trevor Gleeson crediting Martin's form as one of the key reasons for the Wildcats riding a wave of momentum towards the finals. The Wildcats finished with an 18–10 record to claim the minor premiership, before going on to reach the NBL Grand Final series, where they defeated Melbourne United 3–1 to win the championship. Martin and long-time teammate Jesse Wagstaff became the first players in NBL history to win five championships with just one club.

2019–20 season
On 5 April 2019, Martin re-signed with the Wildcats for the 2019–20 season. In December 2019, he played his 300th game for the Wildcats. He missed the entire month of January with a left heel injury, returning for the final two regular season games. In March 2020, he was crowned an NBL champion for the sixth time, becoming one of just four players in NBL history to win six titles, with he and teammate Jesse Wagstaff the only to do it at one club. Following the season, it was revealed Martin had played through the year with an Achilles injury that required a post-season reconstruction.

On 21 July 2020, Martin announced his retirement from basketball after 13 seasons in the NBL and 342 games. Upon retiring, the league named its Best Defensive Player trophy in honour of Martin, with the award now known as the Damian Martin Trophy for the Best Defensive Player of the regular season.

Personal
Martin is the son of Anne and Raymond Martin, and has three brothers, Daniel, John and Anthony, and one sister, Beth. Martin and his wife, Brittany, have three daughters. His wife's cousin is rugby league player Michael Morgan.

References

External links

NBL profile
Perth Wildcats profile
NBL stats
R13 Preview: Martin's 200th falls into place nicely
Damian Martin – 200 Perth Wildcats Games
Damian Martin: Red Army Hero
Damian Martin: Most Inspiring Man
Australia's Most Humble Rio Olympian Just Had Two Amazing Wins
Wildcat Martin hopes for special NBL title
Perth Wildcats skipper Damian Martin on target for another title with strong shooting
A Life Changing Phone Call
300 Games Later: Rob Beveridge and Damian Martin
Wildcats captain Damian Martin's heroic night, defeats Sydney Kings

1984 births
Living people
Australian men's basketball players
Australian expatriate basketball people in the United States
Australian Institute of Sport basketball players
Basketball players at the 2016 Summer Olympics
Loyola Marymount Lions men's basketball players
Olympic basketball players of Australia
People educated at Lake Ginninderra College
People from New South Wales
Perth Wildcats players
Point guards
West Sydney Razorbacks players
Basketball players at the 2018 Commonwealth Games
Commonwealth Games gold medallists for Australia
Commonwealth Games medallists in basketball
2010 FIBA World Championship players
Medallists at the 2018 Commonwealth Games